Taarab is a music genre popular in Tanzania and Kenya. It is influenced by the musical traditions of the African Great Lakes, North Africa, the Middle East, and the Indian subcontinent. Taarab rose to prominence in 1928 with the advent of the genre's first star, Siti binti Saad.

According to local legend, taarab was popularized by Sultan Seyyid Barghash bin Said (1870-1888). He enjoyed luxury and the pleasures of life. It was this ruler who initiated taarab in Zanzibar and later it spread all over the African Great Lakes region. The sultan imported a taarab ensemble from Egypt to play in his Beit el-Ajab palace. He subsequently decided to send Mohamed Ibrahim from Zanzibar to Egypt to learn music and to play the Kanun. Upon his return, he formed the Zanzibar Taarab Orchestra. In 1905, Zanzibar's second music society, Ikwhani Safaa Musical Club, was established, and it continues to thrive today. Ikwhani Safaa and Culture Musical Club (founded in 1958) remain the leading Zanzibar taarab orchestras.

Etymology

The word taarab is a loanword from Arabic. The Arabic word طرب means "having pleasure, delight with music".

History of Taarab music 
After the spreading of Taarab from the Sultan's palace to Zanzibari weddings and other community events, the first famous female singer of taarab was Siti bint Saad. Beginning in 1928, she and her band were the first from the region to make commercial recordings and was the first East African to be recorded in the Bombay HMV studios, in 1928. She would go on to become one of the most famous taarab musicians of all time.

Over the next several decades, bands and musicians like Bi Kidude, Mzee Yusuph, Culture Musical Club and Al-Watan Musical Club kept taarab at the forefront of the Tanzanian scene, and made inroads across the world. Playing in a similar style, Kidumbak ensembles grew popular, at least among the poor of Zanzibar, featuring two small drums, bass, violins and dancers using claves and maracas. The 1960s saw a group called the Black Star Musical Club from Tanga modernize the genre, and brought it to audiences far afield, especially Burundi and Kenya. More recently, modern taarab bands like East African Melody have emerged, as have related backbiting songs for women, called mipasho..

Taarab music is a fusion of pre-Islamic Swahili tunes sung in rhythmic poetic style, spiced with Arab-style melodies. It is an extremely lively art form, and immensely popular especially with women, drawing all the time from old and new sources. Taarab forms a major part of the social life of the Swahili people along the coastal areas, especially in Zanzibar, Tanga and even further in Mombasa and Malindi along the Kenya coast. Wherever the Swahili speaking people travelled, Taraab culture moved with them. It has penetrated as far inland as Uganda, Rwanda and Burundi in East Africa, where taarab groups compete in popularity with western-music inspired groups.

Nowadays a taarab revolution is taking place and much heated debate continues about the music which has been changed drastically by the East African Melody phenomenon. Melody, as they are affectionately known by their mostly female fans, play modern taarab, which, for the first time, is 'taarab to dance to' and features direct lyrics, bypassing the unwritten laws of lyrical subtlety of the older groups, where the meaning of their lyrics is only alluded to, and never directly inferred. Today, taarab songs are explicit – sometimes even graphic – in sexual connotation, and much of the music of groups like Melody and Muungano is composed and played on keyboards, increasing portability for different venues. Also, the groups are much smaller in number than 'real taarab' orchestras and therefore more readily available to tour and play shows throughout the region and beyond.

See also
 Music of Tanzania

Further reading

Sources

External links
 More information on taarab
 Influences upon taarab, and instruments in taarab

Culture of Zanzibar
Tanzanian music
Kenyan styles of music